Ócsa is a town in Pest county, Budapest metropolitan area, Hungary. 30 kilometers south of Budapest.

Árpád Age Romanesque church

The church was originally built in the 13th century by the Premonstratensians for use as a monastery. During the 16th century the village was reformed and the structure was given to the village for use as a public place of worship.

One of the most beautiful Romanesque churches preserved in Hungary, it has 3 naves, a cross nave, and two western towers, following the style common to Hungarian medieval architecture.  It was renovated in the 20th century, according to the plans of modern-day architect Ernő Foerk. The church is interesting not only for its architecture, but for the murals of Saint Ladislaus I of Hungary, the Legendary painted on the northern walls.

Numerous preserved houses and structures in the vicinity recall the life and times of the Hungarian medieval age, including tools, furniture, and other objects of interest.

Bird observatory
A long-standing bird observatory known as the Ócsai Madárvárta is located nearby.

Notable residents
Tamás Csilus, footballer.

Twin towns – sister cities

Ócsa is twinned with:
 Dalgety Bay and Hillend, Scotland, United Kingdom
 Kose, Estonia
 Plášťovce, Slovakia

References
 Gerevich Tibor: Magyarország románkori emlékei, (Romanesque Heritage in Hungary.) Királyi Magyar Egyetemi Nyomda, Budapest, 1938.
 Gerő László (1984): Magyar műemléki ABC. Budapest,
 Henszlmann Imre: Magyarország ó-keresztyén, román és átmeneti stylü mű-emlékeinek rövid ismertetése, Királyi Magyar Egyetemi Nyomda, Budapest, 1876.

External links

  in Hungarian
 Ócsa for tourists
 lap.hu links about Ócsáról
 Natural protection district near Ócsa
 Aerial images about Ócsa
 Street map 

Populated places in Pest County
Romanesque architecture in Hungary